Dysschema amphissum is a moth of the family Erebidae first described by Carl Geyer in 1832. It is found in south-eastern Brazil, ranging from southern Minas Gerais and Rio de Janeiro, south to Rio Grande do Sul.

Females are diurnal and mimic Actinote species.

References

Moths described in 1832
Dysschema